The Brandhorn is a mountain, in the Berchtesgaden Alps in the Austrian state of Salzburg. It lies in the southeast of the Steinernes Meer, at the crossing to the Hochkönig. After the Selbhorn (2,655 m) and Schönfeldspitze (2,653 m) the Brandhorn is the third highest peak in the Steinernes Meer.

Ascent 
The path from the Riemannhaus to the Matrashaus – and thus the E4 alpin long distance path – runs over the Brandhorn. grade I–II, walking duration: 10–12 hours.

Other summit approaches:
 From the Eckbert Hut along the Bohlensteig and Torscharte, I–II, partly secured, 4 hours
 From the Steinhütterl via the Mauerscharte gap and the Alpriedelhorn, trackless, 3½ hours
 From Hinterthal via the Torscharte gap

Literature 

Two-thousanders of Austria
Mountains of the Alps
Berchtesgaden Alps